−This is a list of seasons completed by the Miami University RedHawks men's ice hockey team. 

Miami has made several appearances in the NCAA Division I men's ice hockey tournament, reaching the championship game in 2009.

Season-by-season results

* Winning percentage is used when conference schedules are unbalanced.

Footnotes

References

 
Lists of college men's ice hockey seasons in the United States
Miami RedHawks ice hockey seasons